Deface the Music is the fifth studio album by the band Utopia. The concept of the album was to pay homage to The Beatles and create songs which sounded very similar to the Fab Four's tunes throughout the various stages of their career. Their song "Take It Home", replete with guitar riff, is their homage to "Day Tripper". The first track, "I Just Want to Touch You", was written by Todd Rundgren for the Roadie soundtrack. It was rejected by the movie's producers for fear of legal action because it sounded so much like the Beatles. The original pressing was made to look like an early 1960s Beatles release, with custom inner sleeve advertising their previous three albums even down to the way the vinyl was mastered with wide bands of silence between each song.

Track listing

Charts

See also
The Rutles
Face the Music (Electric Light Orchestra album)

References

1980 albums
Todd Rundgren albums
Albums produced by Todd Rundgren
Utopia (band) albums
Bearsville Records albums
Rhino Records albums
The Beatles tribute albums